Michele Sainte is an American drum and bass DJ and former techno DJ.

Clubs and raves 
Sainte is a former breakbeat hardcore and techno DJ that is also "widely regarded as one of the States' premiere female drumandbass DJs" according to Dieselboy. She is known for mixing the techstep subgenre of drum and bass.

She has DJed throughout North America at clubs and raves as a breakbeat and techno DJ on a regular basis beginning in 1990, dedicating herself exclusively to the Drum&Bass genre by 1995 and performing alongside artists such as 808 State, Joey Beltram, Meat Beat Manifesto.

She became a frequent guest DJ at music venues including City Gardens in Trenton, New Jersey, Guernica (formerly Save the Robots) in Manhattan, The Shelter (New York City), and The Stone Pony in Asbury Park, New Jersey. Also, she was asked to be a resident DJ at Club Zadar in New Hope, Pennsylvania, in January 1990, introducing techno to the new wave venue. In addition, she became a resident DJ at several venues in Philadelphia including Evolution and Skyline. She is considered one of the first female techno DJs from North America and has been cited as "the original East Coast female drum and bass DJ".

Radio 
Sainte became licensed by the FCC in 1986, whilst still a high school student. She has worked at WFMU (named the “best radio station in the nation” by Rolling Stone magazine from 1991 through 1994) and WPRB at Princeton University. In 1995, she created and DJed on a program with live mixing at WPRB that she called Bassquake. Bassquake aired every Friday for five years. It was the United States's first drum and bass/jungle program to air on a commercial FM radio station.

Discography

DJ mixes 
 Fluid Sessions - at Fluid nightclub in Philadelphia, Bioforce Recordings, 1998

Dubplates 
 Badlands (1996)
 Pitch Black (1996)
 The Unseen (1997)
 Retribution with 1.8.7 (1999)
 Dreammaker with Rhys Fulber (2008)
 Diamonds from Your Eyes (2021)

Personal life 
Sainte is a vegan, regularly advocating for veganism on her social media. She is also straight edge. Sainte has acknowledged the support of DJ Lenny Dee. Dieselboy has also been known to support her and she is known as Rhys Fulber’s muse since meeting her during the early 1990s when she was a Techno DJ. She ultimately convinced Fulber to produce Techno and use his German name as opposed to using an alias.

References 

Living people
American women in electronic music
Electronic dance music DJs
Club DJs
American drum and bass musicians
American techno musicians
American women DJs
20th-century American women
Year of birth missing (living people)